Charles-Etienne Briseux (c. 1680-1754) was a French architect.

He was especially successful as a designer of internal decorations, mantel pieces, mirrors, doors and overdoors, ceilings, consoles, candelabra, wall panellings and other fittings, chiefly in the Louis Quinze mode. He was also an industrious writer on architectural subjects.

Works
His principal works are:
L'Architecture moderne (2 vols., 1728).
L'Art de bâtir les maisons de campagne (2 vols., 1743).
Traité du beau essentiel dans les arts, appliqué particulièrement à l'architecture (1752).
Traité des proportions harmoniques.

Notes

References
Attribution:

18th-century French architects
1680 births
1754 deaths
French architecture writers
French Rococo architects